Bruntonichthys is an extinct monospecific genus of arthrodire placoderm from the Early Frasnian stage of the Late Devonian period. Fossils are found in the Gogo Formation of the Kimberley region of Australia. The skull is about 139 millimetres long, and had proportionally large eye sockets.  Researchers suggest it may have preyed on small mollusks.

Phylogeny
Bruntonichthys is a basal member of the clade Aspinothoracidi, which belongs to the clade Pachyosteomorphi, one of the two major clades within Eubrachythoraci. The cladogram below shows the phylogeny of Bruntonichthys:

References

Arthrodires
Arthrodire genera
Gogo fauna
Placoderms of Australia